Mayors of Paterson, New Jersey:

References

 
Paterson